Ravinder Singh Tut (born 23 May 1969) is a British wrestler. He competed in the men's freestyle 62 kg at the 1988 Summer Olympics.

References

1969 births
Living people
British male sport wrestlers
Olympic wrestlers of Great Britain
Wrestlers at the 1988 Summer Olympics
Sportspeople from Wolverhampton